Essex County Fairgrounds is a historic county fair located at Westport in Essex County, New York.  The fairgrounds include 15 contributing buildings, one contributing site, and seven contributing structures.  Four of these, the Grandstand, Judge's Stand, Floral Hall, and Racetrack, were among the original resources on the site when the fair opened in 1885.  The Cooperative Extension Building was built about 1923 and is a two-story, rectangular, Colonial Revival style building with an octagonal cupola.

It was listed on the National Register of Historic Places in 2005.

References

Event venues on the National Register of Historic Places in New York (state)
Colonial Revival architecture in New York (state)
Buildings and structures in Essex County, New York
Tourist attractions in Essex County, New York
National Register of Historic Places in Essex County, New York